The Windermere is a Grade II listed public house at Windermere Avenue, South Kenton, London.

It is on the Campaign for Real Ale's National Inventory of Historic Pub Interiors.

It was built in 1938.

References

Grade II listed buildings in the London Borough of Brent
Grade II listed pubs in London
National Inventory Pubs
Kenton, London
Pubs in the London Borough of Brent